Dynamics (from Greek δυναμικός dynamikos "powerful", from δύναμις dynamis "power") or dynamic may refer to:

Physics and engineering
 Dynamics (mechanics)
 Aerodynamics, the study of the motion of air
 Analytical dynamics, the motion of bodies as induced by external forces
 Brownian dynamics, the occurrence of Langevin dynamics in the motion of particles in solution
 File dynamics, stochastic motion of particles in a channel
 Flight dynamics, the science of aircraft and spacecraft design
 Fluid dynamics or hydrodynamics, the study of fluid flow
 Computational fluid dynamics, a way of studying fluid dynamics using numerical methods
 Fractional dynamics, dynamics with integrations and differentiations of fractional orders 
 Molecular dynamics, the study of motion on the molecular level
 Langevin dynamics, a mathematical model for stochastic dynamics
 Orbital dynamics, the study of the motion of rockets and spacecraft
 Quantum chromodynamics, a theory of the strong interaction (color force)
 Quantum electrodynamics, a description of how matter and light interact
 Relativistic dynamics, a combination of relativistic and quantum concepts
 Stellar dynamics, a description of the collective motion of stars
 System dynamics, the study of the behavior of complex systems
 Thermodynamics, the study of the relationships between heat and mechanical energy
 Vehicle dynamics

Brands and enterprises
 Dynamic (record label), an Italian record label in Genoa
 Arrow Dynamics, roller coaster designer
 Boston Dynamics, robot designer
 Crystal Dynamics, video game developer
 General Dynamics, defence contractor
 Microsoft Dynamics, a line of business software

Computer science and mathematics 
 Dynamical energy analysis, a numerical method modelling structure borne sound and vibration in complex structures
 Dynamic program analysis, a set of methods for analyzing computer software
 Dynamic programming, a mathematical optimization method, and a computer programming paradigm

Internet

 Dynamic HTML, technologies for creating interactive and animated web sites
 Dynamic IP, an IP address that changes every time the computer is turned on
 Dynamic web page, a web page with content that varies

Mathematics

 Dynamical system, a concept describing a point's time dependency
 Topological dynamics, the study of dynamical systems from the viewpoint of general topology
 Symbolic dynamics, a method to model dynamical systems

Social science 
 Group dynamics, the study of social group processes especially 
 Population dynamics, in life sciences, the changes in the composition of a population
 Psychodynamics, the study of psychological forces driving human behavior
 Social dynamics, the ability of a society to react to changes
 Spiral Dynamics, a social development theory

Other uses
 Dynamics (music), the softness or loudness of a sound or note
 DTA Dynamic, a French ultralight trike wing design
 Dynamic microphone, a type of microphone
 Force dynamics, a semantic concept about how entities interact with reference to force
 Ice-sheet dynamics, the motion within large bodies of ice
 Neural oscillation in neurodynamics, a rhythmic pattern in the brain
 Sol Dynamic, a Brazilian paraglider design
 Dynamics (album)
 The Dynamics, American R&B group

See also 
 
 
 Dynamic Host Configuration Protocol
 Kinetics (disambiguation)
 Power (disambiguation)
 Static (disambiguation)